Rashi Mal is an Indian actress, dancer and musician. She made her Hindi film debut in 2018 with Helicopter Eela alongside Kajol and Riddhi Sen.

Early life and career
Mal was born and raised in Delhi. She started her career on stage and is trained in method acting. Mal made her Hindi debut with Helicopter Eela and played a pivotal role in the 2018 film Sir, that won the GAN Foundation award at Cannes Film Festival.

She has worked on multiple web series, each very unique in concept such as Samaira Jal in Hindmata on Eros, Abigail in A.I.SHA My Virtual Girlfriend Voot/TF1 (France) and Saba in "Pyaar Actually" on Hotstar.

In 2014, Rashi played Gauri Laada's role in MTV's Paanch 5 Wrongs Make A Right.

In 2017, She sang the song Buri buri for the film Dear Maya.

Rashi released her debut single Misaal (Hindi) and Paradigm (English) that she wrote and sang in 2020.

She also worked in short films #Letters for MTV-Fameistan, directed by Gautam Govind Sharma and mentored by Mohit Suri and Food for Thought which was nominated for Filmfare Awards 2021.

As of March 2021, Mal is shooting for Ayan Mukerji's Brahmāstra alongside Alia Bhatt and Ranbir Kapoor.

Rashi has most recently worked on Ayan Mukerji's magnum opus Brahmāstra alongside Alia Bhatt and Ranbir Kapoor. The film released on 9th September 2022.

Filmography

Films

Web series

Television

Discography
"Buri buri" from the film Dear Maya
"Beta get married" from "Sacchi Savitris"
"Social Media Love” from "Sachhi Savitris"
Misaal (original)
Paradigm (original)

Awards and honors
 MTV's IWM Buzz Digital Awards 2019
 2022 ITA (Indian Television Awards) for webseries HINDMATA

References

External links

 
 

1990s births
Living people
Indian television actresses
Actresses from Delhi
Actresses in Hindi television
21st-century Indian actresses
Year of birth missing (living people)